Record of Agarest War Zero, known as  in Japan and Agarest: Generations of War Zero in Europe, is a tactical role-playing game developed by Compile Heart and Red Entertainment. It was published in Japan by Idea Factory on June 25, 2009, for the PlayStation 3. It is the prequel to the 2007 game Record of Agarest War.

An enhanced port of Agarest Zero was released for the Xbox 360 titled Agarest Senki Zero: Dawn of War. The Xbox 360 version contained extra content not found in the PlayStation 3 version of the game, such as costumes, CGs and more.
HyperDevbox Japan released ports for Android and iOS.

Both versions feature an extra mode where you can return to the maps from the previous game, and unlock characters via the PlayStation Store or Xbox Live Marketplace.

Gameplay
The battles are the same as the first game, the maps, and the Soul Breed System. Two new systems were introduced, The Feel Link System and the Free Intention. There is also an Extra Mode.

Feel Link
A new system is introduced called the Feel Link System. The Feel Link system is where the heroine's costume and dialog depend on their relationship level.

Free Intention
Another new system where players can build relationship with the heroines. This may result in new costumes, CGs, and items. This is accessed by the City Menu.

Extra Mode
If the players have Clear Data from the first game, it is possible to load it and unlock the Door to the Future after some progress. Through the door, players can access the maps from the first game and unlock items and characters from the first game. Leo, his descendants, the heroines, Ellis and Dyshana are unlocked free. However, other playable characters must be downloaded from the PlayStation Store.

Characters
Agarest Zero has a total of 15 playable characters (9 in the first generation and 6 in the second). Characters from the first game can be unlocked via DLC and the Extra Mode.

Localization
On November 5, 2010, Aksys Games announced that it will bring both the PlayStation 3 and Xbox 360 versions of Agarest Senki Zero to North America as Record of Agarest War Zero. Both versions were released on June 14, 2011.

Ghostlight released Agarest Zero in Europe as a PlayStation 3 exclusive as Agarest: Generations of War Zero on August 26, 2011.

External links
 Record of Agarest War Zero Official website for Mobile version Android/iOS
 Record of Agarest War Zero Official website for North America
 Agarest: Generations of War Zero Official website for Europe
 Agarest Senki Zero  Official website for Japan 
 Agarest Senki Zero: Dawn of War  Official website for Japan

References

2009 video games
Android (operating system) games
Compile Heart games
Dating sims
Fantasy video games
IOS games
Role-playing video games
Romance video games
Red Entertainment games
PlayStation 3 games
Tactical role-playing video games
Video games developed in Japan
Video game prequels
Windows games
Xbox 360 games
Idea Factory games
Single-player video games
Ghostlight games
Laughing Jackal games